Silicon is a peer-reviewed scientific journal published by Springer and founded in 2009 by editor in chief Stephen Clarson. It deals with all aspects of silicon. Published research involves materials biology, materials physics, materials chemistry, materials engineering, and environmental science. The journal caters to chemists, physicists, engineers, biologists, and environmental scientists.

External links 

Chemistry journals
English-language journals
Springer Science+Business Media academic journals
Publications established in 2009
Silicon